Knob Fork may refer to:

Knob Fork, West Virginia, an unincorporated community
Knob Fork (West Virginia), a stream in West Virginia